The 2014 Women's European Water Polo Championship was held from 16 to 26 July 2014 in Budapest, Hungary.

Spain won their first title by defeating the Netherlands 10-5 in the final. Hungary captured the bronze medal after a 10–9 win over Italy.

Qualification

There were eight teams in the 2014 championships. They qualified as follows:
 The host nation
 The best three teams from the 2012 European Championships not already qualified as the host nation
 Four qualifiers

Championships
The structure of the championships is that there were two groups of four teams followed by a knockout phase. The first teams in each group automatically qualified to compete for the semis, and the second & third teams played a crossed match to qualify for the semis too. The last teams in each group played a classification playoff for 7th–8th place.

Squads

Draw
The draw was held on 9 March 2014.

Groups

Preliminary round
The schedule was announced on 10 May 2014.

Group A
All times are CEST (UTC+2).

Group B
All times are CEST (UTC+2).

Final round

Bracket

Quarterfinals
All times are CEST (UTC+2).

7th place match
All times are CEST (UTC+2).

5th place match
All times are CEST (UTC+2).

Semifinals
All times are CEST (UTC+2).

Bronze medal match
All times are CEST (UTC+2).

Gold medal match
All times are CEST (UTC+2).

Final ranking

Team Roster
Laura Ester, Marta Bach, Anni Espar, Roser Tarragó, Mati Ortiz, Jennifer Pareja (C), Lorena Miranda, Pili Peña, Andrea Blas, Ona Meseguer, Maica García, Laura LópezPatricia Herrera. Head coach: Miki Oca

Awards and statistics

Top goalscorers

Individual awards

Most Valuable Player

Best Goalkeeper

Top Scorer
 — 19 goals

References

External links
Official website

Women
Women's European Water Polo Championship
International water polo competitions hosted by Hungary
Women's water polo in Hungary
Women's European Water Polo Championship
Euro
July 2014 sports events in Europe
International sports competitions in Budapest
2010s in Budapest